is a railway station in Aoba-ku, Sendai in Miyagi Prefecture, Japan, operated by East Japan Railway Company (JR East).

Lines

Station layout
The station has one single side platform serving a sign bi-directional track. The station is staffed.

History
Kitayama Station opened on 1 February 1984.

Passenger statistics
In fiscal 2018, the station was used by an average of 2,499 passengers daily (boarding passengers only).

Surrounding area
 Tohoku Fukushi University
Kitayama Cemetery
Sendai Aramaki Post Office

References

External links

 

Stations of East Japan Railway Company
Railway stations in Sendai
Senzan Line 
Railway stations in Japan opened in 1984